Timothy Bartlett is a New Zealand stage, television and film actor who is best known for presenting TVNZ's Playschool in the 1980s, and playing Bernie Leach in Shortland Street in the mid 1990s. He first appeared in professional theatre for Auckland's Theatre Corporate in 1974. He has also appeared in An Angel at My Table, Soldier Soldier, The Tommyknockers, Duggan, Holby City, Out of the Blue, The Hobbit: An Unexpected Journey and The Hobbit: The Battle of the Five Armies.

Filmography

References

Year of birth missing (living people)
Living people
New Zealand male television actors
New Zealand male stage actors
New Zealand male film actors
20th-century New Zealand male actors
Place of birth missing (living people)
New Zealand male soap opera actors
21st-century New Zealand male actors